Aslıhan Güner (born 17 December 1984) is a Turkish actress.

Her mother is from Malatya, while her father is from Sivas. Her maternal grandparent is of Bosnian descent. Her paternal grandparent is of Turkish descent who immigrated from Bulgaria. She studied public relations and advertising at the university but left without completing her education. Güner then studied acting at the Barış Manço Culture Center. In June 2013, she married Mert Kılıç, her co-star from Şefkat Tepe. 

After appearing in a number of supporting roles in popular series, her breakthrough came with the TV series Asi and Şefkat Tepe, in which she had leading roles. She joined in historical series "Bir Zamanlar Osmanlı", "Diriliş: Ertuğrul" and agent series "Kızıl Elma".

She played in comedy series "Kuzey Yıldızı". Meanwhile, she appeared in different movies, notably comedy film series Sümela'nın Şifresi: Temel.

Filmography

References

External links
 
 

Living people
1987 births
Actresses from Istanbul
Turkish television actresses
Turkish film actresses